Max Streibl (6 January 1932 – 11 December 1998) was a German politician of the Christian Social Union (CSU) party and the eighth Minister President of Bavaria.

Biography

Streibel was born in Oberammergau in 1932, where his parents owned a hotel business. He married his wife Irmingard in 1960 and they had one daughter and two sons.

After going to school in Ettal, he studied law in Munich, graduating in 1955. He worked in Garmisch-Partenkirchen, and later, at the German Bundesrat in Bonn and joint the local government of the region of Upper Bavaria in 1960. From 1961, he worked for the state government and began to rise in the  ranks of the CSU. From 1961 to 1967, he led the Junge Union  (Young Union), the youth organisation of CDU and CSU in Bavaria. 

He became a member of the Bavarian Landtag in 1962, a position he held until 1994, when he retired. He was then the General Secretary of the party from 1967 to 1970.

Streibl served as Bavarian Minister for the Environment (1970–1977), a newly formed ministry, and for Finance (1977–1988).
After the sudden death of Franz Josef Strauß in 1988, Streibl succeeded him as Ministerpräsident of Bavaria on 19 October 1988. 
Streibl was deeply rooted in Catholicism, but soon became unpopular because of alleged bribery (he was paid holiday trips by Burkhart Grob, the chairman of an aircraft production company). Because of this so-called "amigo-affair", coming to the surface in January 1993, he was forced to resign on 27 May 1993 and Edmund Stoiber took office, despite the latter being involved in the affair, too. The affair did result in a policy change in Bavaria, aimed at untangling the connections between politics and business. 

Streibl's defiant final words upon his resignation, with a tear in his eyes, were "Adios Amigos!".

He retired from politics shortly after and died in December 1998 in Munich.

Honors
 Honorary Doctorates from the Universities of Passau (1985) and Munich (1990).
 Grand Cross of Merit of the Italian Republic (1988)
 Honorary Citizen of Oberammergau (1989)
 Grand Cross of the Order Pro Merito Melitensi of the Sovereign Military Order of Malta
 Order of the Holy Sepulchre

Further reading
 
 Max Streibl, Bayerischer Ministerpräsident, (in German) author: Max Streibl, Gerhard A. Friedl, publisher: Carl Gerber Verlag, 1989, 
 Modell Bayern. Ein Weg in die Zukunft, (in German) author: Max Streibl, publisher: Carl Gerber Verlag, 1985,

References

External links
 Official Bavarian government website - Max Streibel biography (in German)

1932 births
1998 deaths
People from Garmisch-Partenkirchen (district)
Ministers-President of Bavaria
Ministers of the Bavaria State Government
Members of the Landtag of Bavaria
German Roman Catholics
Knights Grand Cross of the Order of Merit of the Italian Republic
Knights of the Holy Sepulchre
Grand Crosses with Star and Sash of the Order of Merit of the Federal Republic of Germany
Recipients of the Order pro Merito Melitensi